San Giovanni Rotondo is the name of a town and comune in the province of Foggia and region of Apulia, in southern Italy.

San Giovanni Rotondo was the home of Saint Pio of Pietrelcina from 28 July 1916 until his death on 23 September 1968.  The Padre Pio Pilgrimage Church was built in devotion to the saint and dedicated on 1 July 2004. The town is renowned for its hospital and medical-research centre Casa Sollievo della Sofferenza (Home for the Relief of the Suffering) founded by Saint Pio of Pietrelcina.

The nearby Sanctuary of Saint Michael the Archangel is also the site of Catholic pilgrimages and was visited by Pope John Paul II in 1987.

International relations

 
San Giovanni Rotondo is twinned with:

  Pietrelcina in Italy, since 2005 
  Wadowice in Poland, since 2006 
  Monte Sant'Angelo, since 2013

Notable people
Ivano Ciano (born 1983), Italian footballer
Claudio Damiani, Italian poet
Michele Pirro (born 1986), Italian MotoGP rider

References

External links